The 3rd Military Region of Vietnam People's Army is directly under the Ministry of Defence of Vietnam, tasked to organise, build, manage and command armed forces defending the Red River Delta. The north-West region of Vietnam borders with the Guangxi, China. In 1979, Chinese army with one infantry division, launched an invasion in this military zone.

 Command Headquarters: Hai Phong city
 Commander: Major General Nguyễn Quang Ngọc
 Political Commissar: Lieutenant General Nguyễn Quang Cường
 Deputy Commander cum Chief of Staff Commander: Major General Nguyễn Đức Dũng

Agencies
 Headquarters of Staff
 Logistics Department
 Technical Department
 Department of Politics

Units
 Military Command of Hải Phòng Province.
 Military Command of Quảng Ninh Province.
 Military Command of Hải Dương Province.
 Military Command of Hưng Yên Province
 Military Command of Thái Bình Province
 Military Command of Nam Định Province
 Military Command of Hà Nam Province
 Military Command of Ninh Bình Province
 Military Command of Hòa Bình Province
 Military School of Military Zone (in Chí Linh County of Hải Dương Province)
 395th Division (in  Yên Hưng County of Quảng Ninh Province)
 350th Division (in Ninh Bình Province)
 327th Defence Economic Division
 319th Construction Company (in Long Biên of Hà Nội)- created on 7 March 1979 as the 319th Defence Economics Division. Present there are 3475 technic workers, 763 technic and manage cadre, of which 573 persons with bachelor's degree.
 273rd Tank Regiment (in Hải An of Hải Phòng)
 242nd Infantry Regiment (in Vân Đồn County of Quảng Ninh Province)
 603rd Regiment
 405th Tank Regiment
 513th Combat Engineer Brigade.
 214th Anti-Aircraft Brigade.
 454th Artillery Brigade.
 7th Army Medical Hospital (subordinate to Department of Logistics)
 5th Army Medical Hospital (subordinate to Department of Logistics)

References

Military regions of the People's Army of Vietnam